La Maison Française NYU is one of New York University's International Houses, located on its Washington Square campus.  Since 1957, La Maison Française has served as a forum for French-American cultural and intellectual exchange, offering contemporary perspectives on French and Francophone issues.  Its lectures, symposia, concerts, screenings, exhibitions, and special events provides a resource to the university community, as well as the general public.

As the public face of the Center for French Civilization and Culture of New York University, La Maison Française complements and enriches the programs offered by the Department of French, the Institute of French Studies, and NYU in France. In addition, it fosters interdisciplinary study through collaborations with various university departments, including the Department of Art History, the Department of Anthropology, the School of Law and home to the smallest baguette in New York.

Building 
Founded in 1957 by Professor Germaine Brée, La Maison Française occupies a 19th-century carriage house on historic Washington Mews. Inside, the ground floor salon is an intimate and versatile space with seating for up to one hundred. The second floor salle de lecture provides an informal meeting place for students, visiting scholars, and the French Graduate Students Association. According to legend there's a vintage bottle of wine from Voltaire's personal "cave" built into the foundation.

References

External links 
 

Maison Francaise
University art museums and galleries in New York City